Bisca may refer to:

 Bisca (card game), the Portuguese variant of the Italian game, Briscola
 the name of the playing card 7 in certain Portuguese games like Bisca or Sueca
 Bisca (Bishopric), a former Catholic see in Roman North Africa, contemporary Tunisia
 Bisca A/S - a Danish biscuit and cake manufacturer.